The 2013 Paris–Nice was the 71st running of the Paris–Nice cycling stage race, often known as the Race to the Sun. It started on 3 March in Houilles and ended on 10 March in Nice and consisted of eight stages, including a race-commencing prologue and a race-concluding mountain individual time trial. It was the second race of the 2013 UCI World Tour season.

Porte won the general classification by 55 seconds over runner-up Andrew Talansky, who was winner of the race's third stage. Talansky also won the white jersey for the young rider classification, as he was the highest placed rider born in 1988 or later. 's Jean-Christophe Péraud completed the podium, 26 seconds behind Talansky and 81 seconds down on Porte.

In the race's other classifications, 's Sylvain Chavanel was the winner of the green jersey for the points classification, amassing the highest number of points during stages at intermediate sprints and stage finishes, and Johann Tschopp was the winner of the mountains classification for the  team, who were making their World Tour début at the race.  were the winners of the teams classification on their World Tour return, having missed the Tour Down Under after temporarily losing their World Tour status before successfully appealing the decision to the Court of Arbitration for Sport.

Teams
As Paris–Nice was a UCI World Tour event, all UCI ProTeams were invited automatically and obligated to send a squad. Originally, eighteen ProTeams were invited to the race, with four other squads given wildcard places, and as such, would have formed the event's 22-team peloton.  subsequently regained their ProTour status after an appeal to the Court of Arbitration for Sport. With  not originally invited to the race, race organisers announced their inclusion to the race, bringing the total number of teams competing to twenty-three.

The 23 teams that competed in the race were:

Among the 184-rider start list was only one previous race winner; Andreas Klöden, who triumphed in 2000, competed for the  team.

Stages

Prologue
3 March 2013 — Houilles,  individual time trial (ITT)

The opening stage of the 2013 Paris–Nice was a short, flat, yet technical individual time trial stage in and around the Yvelines commune of Houilles, around  outside Paris. Packed into just under  of racing were numerous 90-degree bends, requiring riders to make short, sharp bursts of acceleration. As such, the stage itself was not suited towards any kind of time trial specialists; instead, riders who had a track background, rouleurs or certain sprinters who had sufficient pace to complete the course in a favourable time. Weather was not expected to be a major factor in the stage proceedings, unlike previous race-opening time trial stages. Marco Bandiera was the first rider to start the stage, on the World Tour début for his team, .

Bandiera recorded a time of 3' 55" for the course, but was almost immediately bettered by 's Yuri Trofimov and  rider Stijn Vandenbergh. However, his stay at the top was also short-lived as 's Maarten Tjallingii went three seconds quicker to move to the top of the timesheets.  sprinter Borut Božič was the next rider to assume the stage lead, as he set a time of 3' 40"; his time was ultimately good enough for a final placing of eighth. Božič's time provided a stiff test for the majority of the field, as his time held on at the top for over half an hour, but Peter Velits ultimately went quicker by less than a second to take the lead.

Another  sprinter, and former French under-23 time trial champion, Geoffrey Soupe was the first rider to go underneath 3' 40", but he would ultimately lose out on white jersey honours – for young rider classification leader – to Tjallingii's teammate Wilco Kelderman, who completed the course marginally quicker. Gaudin's time of 3' 37" held until the end of the stage, and gave him his first victory as a professional, a performance he later described as "mad". Both riders were satisfied with their performances post-stage.

Stage 1
4 March 2013 — Saint-Germain-en-Laye to Nemours, 

The first mass-start stage of the race was set up ideally for the sprinters, with very little on the course to threaten the peloton. Over the course of the  parcours, there was very little fluctuation of altitude, even with only one categorised climb en route. Intermediate sprints at Malesherbes and La Madeleine-sur-Loing offered bonus seconds towards the general classification, the latter coming on a  loop around Nemours, before the stage finish.

A trio of riders – 's Bert-Jan Lindeman,  rider Romain Sicard and Yannick Talabardon of  – made the early breakaway from the field, and managed to extend their advantage to the peloton to almost seven-and-a-half minutes at one point during the stage, before eventually stabilising at the five-minute mark for the majority of the stage. Lindeman took maximum points on offer during the stage; he crossed each of the two intermediate sprint lines in first position, ahead of Talabardon and Sicard on both occasions, while it was the same order at the Côte de Buthiers, where Lindeman secured the polka-dot jersey for the day. After the climb, there was a crash in the peloton, which forced Rui Costa to withdraw from the race, with a wrist injury, bruising and stitches.

As the leaders were brought back towards the main field, an increase of pace in the peloton caused it to separate, and caught out several of the expected stage challengers, such as 's Marcel Kittel and 's Tom Boonen, who won the first mass-start stage in the 2012 edition of the race. Both riders would eventually finish in a group that finished just under two minutes behind the lead group. The lead trio were eventually caught with around  remaining, with the sprinters' teams moving towards the front of the peloton from there on, before the finish in Nemours.  tried to set it up for Leigh Howard but their sprint train was overhauled by Boonen's teammate Sylvain Chavanel, who launched his sprint first. With ten bonus seconds on the finish line, Bouhanni took the leader's yellow jersey from 's Damien Gaudin, who finished in the main field.

Stage 2
5 March 2013 — Vimory to Cérilly, 

However, the stage was still designed to suit the sprinters, with the uphill finish also aiding the chances for the puncheurs.

Smukulis and Christensen soldiered on with a lead of around four minutes, but the peloton were back together by the  mark, as  established the pace of the group, to keep the overall leader Nacer Bouhanni out of danger.

However, Bouhanni hit the ground heavily while negotiating a left-hand bend, falling face first. He had to abandon the race with two broken teeth, and required eight stitches for a burst lip. The peloton was neutralised as Bouhanni was receiving treatment by the roadside, but the pace lifted once again, after confirmation of Bouhanni's abandonment had been received by his teammates. The breakaway was negated with  left to cover of the stage, when the sprinters' teams started to make early headway towards the front of the peloton. Several solo attacks were neutralised on the loop around Cérilly, which set up a sprint finish.  tried to launch Alessandro Petacchi first, but Marcel Kittel finished strongest down the right-hand side of the road and achieved his second win of the season by three bike lengths. Finishing just behind was Viviani, who became the race's third leader in successive days, as well as taking the lead of both the points and young rider classifications.

Stage 3
6 March 2013 — Châtel-Guyon to Brioude, 

Following the sprinter-friendly stages of the previous two days, the third stage was more undulating and included three categorised climbs during its  itinerary. In between the two intermediate sprint points – coming in the communes of Joze, and in Brioude itself – were two third-category climbs of the Col de Potey and the Côte de la Forêt de la Comté, but neither averaged more than 5% in gradient over the duration of their ascents. The climb itself was seen as the pivotal point of the day's action, whether the sprinters could stay with the main field before the descent back into Brioude.

Heavy rain made riding conditions slightly treacherous, but the day's breakaway formed in the opening kilometres as normal. For the second day running, 's Mads Christensen made it into an attacking move, where he was joined by  rider Martijn Keizer, Sébastien Minard and Alexis Vuillermoz of the  team. The quartet slowly built up their advantage over the peloton, being led by the  team – protecting the race leader Elia Viviani – to a maximum advantage of around four minutes. Keizer led the group over the top of the two third-category climbs, and as a result, took the polka-dot jersey for mountains classification leader away from his teammate Bert-Jan Lindeman. After several foiled attacks from his  teammate Maxim Iglinsky, Andriy Hrivko attacked towards the top of the Côte de Mauvagnat, and managed to build a small advantage before 's Vasil Kiryienka bridged the gap on the descent from the climb.

Malacarne tried a solo attack at the flamme rouge, but was chased down not long after, gesturing at his fellow escapees as they did so. Porte tried a long stint on the front of the group, but Bardet accelerated past him only to fade shortly after, and it was Talansky that prevailed by a bike length over Malacarne and Izagirre. With Viviani distanced on the final climb, Talansky became the race's fourth different leader, taking the young rider lead from Viviani as well.

Stage 4
7 March 2013 — Brioude to Saint-Vallier, 

Starting in the previous day's finishing commune of Brioude, the fourth stage was packed full of climbs, with a total of seven over the course of the  parcours. The last two climbs – both coming inside the final  of racing – were both second-category ascents of the Côte de Talencieux and the Côte de la Sizeranne, with gradients of 8.1% and 6.6% respectively. Along with the seven climbs, there were two intermediate sprint points at La Chaise-Dieu and Saint-Romain-d'Ay.

Moreno elected not to continue with the breakaway, but the group remained as a trio, as 's Thomas Voeckler moved up on them. The group's maximum advantage was around four minutes, with  setting the pace for race leader Andrew Talansky. Numerous teams had stints on the front of the peloton, as they steadily brought back the lead group, as Tschopp accumulated enough points to take the polka-dot jersey as mountains classification leader.

With  remaining, Voeckler made a move off the front of the lead group, with only Dupont able to follow in the original instance. Tschopp and Meersman both later rejoined in the crosswinds, while behind the peloton was splitting into several groups; the front group of the main field eventually recaptured the four leaders with around  remaining. With the group back together, several riders attempted to create solo moves on the final climb, the Côte de la Sizeranne, and on its descent. 's Sylvain Chavanel was prominent in several moves on the climb; with assistance from teammate Kevin De Weert, Chavanel chased down a move by Maxime Monfort, but was not allowed to gain sufficient ground due to his placing in the general classification. Coppel tried to repeat his Dauphiné move in the closing stages, but it was left to a group sprint of around forty riders. Iglinsky managed to hold on to second ahead of Chavanel's teammate Peter Velits, while Talansky maintained the race lead with a sixth-place finish.

Stage 5
8 March 2013 — Châteauneuf-du-Pape to La Montagne de Lure, 

The climb itself was the last of six categorised climbs during the stage, although the other climbs en route – mainly second- and third-category climbs compared to the first-category finishing climb – were less steep and challenging to the field as a whole. Also as part of the parcours were two intermediate sprint points at Saint-Saturnin-lès-Apt and Forcalquier. La Montagne de Lure, described as the "little sister of Mont Ventoux", had previously featured in the race in 2009, when Alberto Contador soloed to victory during that year's sixth stage, beating closest rivals Fränk Schleck and Luis León Sánchez by almost a minute, and taking the race lead in the process.

The quartet steadily built up a lead over the peloton, eventually reaching a maximum advantage of around six-and-a-half minutes, but still causing no threat overall as Hupond was the best placed of the riders, some nine minutes behind the overnight leader 's Andrew Talansky. For most of the stage, the advantage remained between four and five minutes, with Talansky's squad maintaining their presence at the front of the peloton. Heading towards the final climb at La Montagne de Lure, the leaders still held a lead of approaching two minutes but was quickly being dwindled, with  moving their riders towards the front.

At the foot of the climb, Voigt attacked on his own for the second time during the stage, as the peloton began to shrink with the pace mainly being set by Kanstantsin Sivtsov and David López, with the squad's leader Richie Porte just behind them. Voigt's fellow breakaway companions were caught with around  remaining, while Voigt remained a further minute up the road. He was caught  later, which set up a spate of attacks in the following few kilometres. Talansky tried a second move, but Quintana led the rest of the ever-decreasing group up to him. Denis Menchov attacked just before  to go, and was initially given freedom to build a gap, at which point, Talansky made a third move before Porte closed him down again. Porte launched his own attack with  left, quickly catching and passing Menchov, and soloed away to the stage victory and the yellow jersey. Menchov finished second, 26 seconds behind, while Talansky led a small group over the line in third, 33 seconds behind Porte.

Stage 6
9 March 2013 — Manosque to Nice, 

The penultimate stage of the race was also its longest of the 2013 edition, with a  itinerary for the peloton as the race moved towards the coast and Nice itself. As a result, it was still expected to come down to a sprint finish at the end, but the severity of the climbs was certain to rule out many of the pure sprinters from the finish.

 rider Egor Silin was the catalyst of the breakaway, attacking on the Côte du Bois de Rousset, gaining maximum points on offer for the climb. After taking second place points behind Silin on the first climb of the day, Tschopp proceeded to take maximum points at the remaining four climbs of the day's stage, guaranteeing himself an unassailable lead in the classification. With 64 points, Tschopp held a 40-point lead over 's Thierry Hupond, with only ten points left to be taken at the finish of the following day's individual time trial at Col d'Èze, a first-category climb.

The breakaway was brought back by the main field prior to the day's second and final intermediate sprint point at Tourrettes-sur-Loup, with  remaining of the stage. 's Andriy Hrivko as well as  pairing Peter Velits and Sylvain Chavanel attacked prior to the sprint, to gain vital bonus seconds towards the general classification. The trio returned to the peloton after the sprint, and ultimately  manned the front of the main group towards the finish in Nice, to set up the bunch sprint of around sixty riders.  and the  moved towards the front for Samuel Dumoulin and Philippe Gilbert respectively, but Chavanel surprised both riders to take the sprint on the line. His result, a third stage win at Paris–Nice, gave him the lead in the points classification as well as moving him into third place overall, with ten bonus seconds.

Stage 7
10 March 2013 — Nice to Col d'Èze,  individual time trial (ITT)

For the second year in succession, the race concluded at Col d'Èze on the outskirts of Nice, with a mountainous individual time trial. The  test against the clock began in Nice, with the steepest part of the climb coming in the early stages, reaching a gradient of 8.5% – against the average for the climb of 4.7% – in the second kilometre. The intermediate timing point came at the Col des Quatre Chemins,  from the finish, with the final  towards the summit of Col d'Èze were contested on a false flat. In 2012, the stage saw Bradley Wiggins and Lieuwe Westra battle it out for the general classification, with Wiggins winning the stage by two seconds and the race by eight seconds. As was customary of time trial stages, cyclists set off in reverse order from where they were ranked in the general classification at the end of the previous stage.

Flens set the first benchmark with a time of 22' 35". Evaldas Šiškevičius of the  team was next to hold first place, going eleven seconds quicker than Flens, before prologue winner Damien Gaudin went fastest with a time of 22' 11". His lead was to last less than a minute as 's Jérémy Roy went comfortably quicker than his time, more than a minute faster in a time of 20' 59". Roy held the best time for the best part of an hour before 's Mattia Cattaneo knocked eight seconds off the benchmark. Ion Izagirre moved the best time nearer the 20-minute mark as he took another eleven seconds off the best time, before his time was usurped by Michele Scarponi, as the  rider put in a solid performance and went top on 20' 19". The first of four sub 20-minute times was recorded by the 's Nairo Quintana, setting a time of 19' 43", holding his pace all the way up the climb.

Quintana's time held into the later moments of the stage, as the top ten overall contenders hit the course. Simon Špilak had gone quicker to the intermediate point than Quintana, but faded in the second half of the stage, and was thus unable to match his fourth place of 2012. Talansky set the fastest intermediate split at the time, going six seconds quicker than 's Jean-Christophe Péraud, but Porte passed the same point 21 seconds quicker than Talansky had done so. Péraud had faded to five seconds behind Quintana at the finish – despite falling at the start – and with slower times for those around in him the general classification, he sealed a place on the final podium. Talansky crossed the finish line with the fastest time, going four seconds quicker than Quintana with a time of 19' 39". However, Porte sealed victory in the race, and the stage itself, punching the air as he crossed the line in a time of 19' 16", four seconds slower than Wiggins' winning time of 2012.

Classification leadership table
In the 2013 Paris–Nice, four different jerseys were awarded. For the general classification, calculated by adding each cyclist's finishing times on each stage, and allowing time bonuses for the first three finishers on mass-start stages, the leader received a yellow jersey. This classification was considered the most important of the 2013 Paris–Nice, and the winner of the classification was considered the winner of the race.

Additionally, there was a points classification, which awarded a green jersey. In the points classification, cyclists got points for finishing in the top 20 in a stage. Unlike in the better known points classification in the Tour de France, the type of stage had no effect on what points were on offer – each stage had the same points available on the same scale. The win earned 25 points, second place earned 22 points, third 20, fourth 18, fifth 16, and one point fewer per place down to a single point for 20th. In addition, points could be won in intermediate sprints; three points for crossing the sprint line first, two points for second place, and one for third.

There was also a mountains classification, the leadership of which was marked by a red and white polka-dot jersey. In the mountains classification, points were won by reaching the top of a climb before other cyclists. Each climb was categorised as either first, second, or third-category, with more points available for the higher-categorised climbs. For first-category climbs, points were awarded on a scale of 10 points for first across the climb, second place earned 8 points, third 6, fourth 4, and one point fewer per place down to a single point for seventh. Second-category climbs awarded points on a scale of 7 points for first place, second place earned 5 points, third 3, and one point fewer per place down to a single point for fifth. Third-category climbs, and the one fourth-category climb, awarded points to the top three riders only; 4 points for first across the climb, second place earned 2 points, third place earned 1 point.

The fourth jersey represented the young rider classification, marked by a white jersey. This was decided the same way as the general classification, but only riders born after 1 January 1988 were eligible to be ranked in the classification.

There was also a classification for teams, in which the times of the best three cyclists per team on each stage were added together; the leading team at the end of the race was the team with the lowest total time.

References

External links

 

Paris-Nice
Paris-Nice
Paris–Nice
Paris-Nice